FC Shukura Kobuleti, commonly known as Shukura Kobuleti or simply Shukura, is a Georgian football club from Kobuleti, the second largest city of Adjara. 

After the 2022 season, they were promoted to Erovnuli Liga, the top tier of Georgian championship.

History
Established in 1968, Shukura played three seasons in the Soviet third division. 

After an independent Georgian league was formed in 1990, the club took part in II league competition before getting promoted to Umaglesi Liga for 1993/94. After one season, though, they lost the relegation battle.

A decade later the team managed to earn another promotion after 2003/04, but facing severe financial problems, Shukura was unable to play in the first tier.
 
In 2011/12 Shukura won the third division and advanced to II league. They  had another successful season in 2013/14, when the club returned to the top flight and also for the first time reached the semifinals of David Kipiani Cup after Umaglesi Liga clubs WIT Georgia and Merani had been eliminated.

In October 2019 Giorgi Shashiashvili took the helm of Shukura and a year later led the club to successful completion of their promotion goal, although after one season the club returned to league 2.
 
The team came close to the Cup final in 2021. Having initially beaten Dinamo Tbilisi, Shukura was ahead of Samgurali three minutes before the stoppage time, but still lost a dramatic five-goal thriller.    

In 2022, Shukura sealed the first place in Liga 2 for the third time in a decade and claimed the champion's record-breaking fifth title in the history of this division.

Seasons

Current squad 
As of 28 February 2023

 

 

 (C)

Honours
Erovnuli Liga 2:
Winners (5): 1992-93, 2003-04, 2013-14, 2020, 2022

Notable players
Davit Khocholava, who later became Shakhtar Donetsk defender and the national team member, played 25 matches for Shukura in  2014/15.

Stadium
Chele Arena, home ground to FC Shukura, is named after Revaz Chelebadze, the famous football player born in Kobuleti. It has the capacity of 6,000 seats. In 2023 a plan to build a new stadium with a capacity of 8,000 seats is in works.

Other teams
Shukura have a reserve team, taking part in the Regionuli Liga tournament.

Name
Shukura literally means a lighthouse, which is duly depicted on the club's emblem.

External links
 Soccerway

 Facebook

References

Football clubs in Georgia (country)
FC Shukura Kobuleti
FC Shukura Kobuleti